Ram Jhula  is an iron suspension bridge across the river Ganges, located  north-east from the town Rishikesh in the Indian state of Uttarakhand. The bridge connects the Sivananda Nagar area of Muni Ki Reti in Tehri Garhwal district to Swargashram in Pauri Garhwal district crossing the river from west to east. Built in the year 1986, the bridge is one of the iconic landmarks of Rishikesh.

There are many Hindu ashrams and religious centers established at both sides of the Ganges. It is also a connecting bridge between Sivananda Ashram located in Muni Ki Reti to Gita Bhawan, Parmarth Niketan and other temples located in Swargashram. Though similar in design, this bridge is bigger than Lakshman Jhula which is  upwards the river stream.

Motorbikes are allowed to run on this bridge.

References 

Tourist attractions in Uttarakhand
Bridges over the Ganges
Bridges completed in 1980
Bridges in Uttarakhand
Tehri Garhwal district
Suspension bridges
Transport in Rishikesh
20th-century architecture in India